The Hymne an Deutschland (Hymn to Germany) is a patriotic song which the then-president of West Germany, Theodor Heuss, aspired to establish as the new national anthem of Germany. During the early 1950s prior to the adoption of "Deutschlandlied" by West Germany, it acted as a sort of de facto national anthem of the nascent state.

History
Its lyrics were written by Rudolf Alexander Schröder in 1950. Hermann Reutter composed its tune after Carl Orff, whom Heuss wanted to have as composer, had rejected the request and suggested Reutter instead. Heuss’ attempts failed, and in 1952 he and Chancellor Adenauer recognized the "Deutschlandlied" as the new national anthem, with only the third stanza being sung on official occasions.

Text

See also 
 Brecht's Kinderhymne
 Auferstanden aus Ruinen
 Deutschlandlied
 Heil dir im Siegerkranz
 Trizonesien-Song

References

External links 
 Short description, tune, and lyrics
 Speech by Theodor Heuss on New Year’s Eve introducing the song to the public (in German)

German patriotic songs
German music
German culture